The State of Marriage is a 2015 documentary film about the origins of the marriage equality movement, focusing on the decades of grassroots advocacy by lawyers Mary Bonauto, Susan Murray, and Beth Robinson and the 1999 Vermont Supreme Court case Baker v. Vermont. The film had its world premiere at the 2015 Provincetown International Film Festival on 18 June 2015. It is written and directed by Jeff Kaufman, and produced by Kaufman and Marcia Ross. Funding for the film's post-production and editing work was partially raised through a successful Indiegogo crowdfunding campaign.

Background 
The film depicts the decades-long battle for marriage equality, beginning in Vermont in the 1990s. In 1997, Bonauto, a lawyer at Gay & Lesbian Advocates & Defenders (GLAD), joined forces with two local attorneys, Murray and Robinson, to file a lawsuit against the State of Vermont on behalf of three same-sex couples, Stan Baker and Peter Harrigan, Lois Farnham and Holly Puterbaugh, and Nina Beck and Stacy Jolles. The suit, Baker v. Vermont, ignited state- and nationwide controversy, but eventually resulted in a 1999 State Supreme Court victory and the passage of Civil Unions in 2000, which gave gay and lesbian couples the rights of marriage but not the name. Still, the bill was a national first, and paved the way for gay marriage initiatives in other states, as well as the passage of full same-sex marriage rights in Vermont in 2009.

Kaufman was a radio host in Vermont during the initial legal battle, and witnessing the events unfold inspired the creation of the documentary. The film was shot in Vermont between July 2013 and February 2014.

Cast 

Jeffrey Amestoy
Stan Baker
Nina Beck
Rev. Craig Bensen
Mary Bonauto
Mark Candon
Steve Cable
Sherry Corbin
Howard Dean
Diane Derby
Ruth Dwyer
John Edwards
Kevin Ellis
Pat Fagan
Lois Farnham
Peter Harrigan
Eve Jacobs-Carnahan
Stacy Jolles
Rep. John Lewis
Bill Lippert
Tom Little
Marion Milne
David Moats
Susan Murray
Holly Puterbaugh
Beth Robinson
Marty Rouse
Peter Shumlin
Shap Smith
Ross Sneyd
Evan Wolfson

Reception
The Hollywood Reporter gave The State of Marriage a favorable review, calling it an "indispensable addition to the filmed history of the marriage equality movement".

References

External links
 

2015 films
2015 documentary films
American documentary films
Documentary films about same-sex marriage in the United States
American LGBT-related films
2015 LGBT-related films
Documentary films about Vermont
LGBT in Vermont
2010s English-language films
2010s American films